The Boundary Estate is a housing development in the London Borough of Tower Hamlets, in the East End of London. 

It is positioned just inside Bethnal Green's historic parish and borough boundary with Shoreditch, which ran along Boundary Street, on the western edge of the estate. In 1965 Bethnal Green merged into the new London Borough of Tower Hamlets, while Shoreditch merged into the new London Borough of Hackney. Boundary Street continued to form the boundary between the two new local authorities..

The estate, constructed from 1890, was one of the earliest social housing schemes built by a local government authority. It was built on the site of the demolished Friars Mount rookery in the Old Nichol, with works begun by the Metropolitan Board of Works in 1893 and completed by the recently formed London County Council.

Soil from the foundations was used to construct a mound in the middle of Arnold Circus at the centre of the development, surmounted by an extant bandstand. The estate consists of multistorey brick tenements radiating from the central circus, each of which bears the name of a town or village along the non-tidal reaches of the Thames.

History

Old Nichol rookery
In 1680 John Nichol of Gray's Inn, who had built seven houses here, leased  of gardens for 180 years to a London mason, Jon Richardson, with permission to dig for bricks. The land became built up piecemeal with houses, built by a number of sub-lessees. Many of the streets were named after Nichol, and by 1827 the  estate consisted of 237 houses.

Henry Mayhew visited Bethnal Green in 1850, and noted for The Morning Chronicle the trades in the area: tailors, costermongers, shoemakers, dustmen, sawyers, carpenters, cabinet makers and silkweavers. In the area, it was noted:
Roads were unmade, often mere alleys, houses small and without foundations, subdivided and often around unpaved courts. An almost total lack of drainage and sewerage was made worse by the ponds formed by the excavation of brickearth. Pigs and cows in back yards, noxious trades like boiling tripe, melting tallow, or preparing cat's meat, and slaughter houses, dustheaps, and 'lakes of putrefying night soil' added to the filth.

In about 1860 in A Visit to the Rookery of St Giles and its Neighbourhood, he mentions the area again and uses the term rookery.

The vicar of St. Philip's, the church serving the Nichol, quoted by Frederick Engels, stated that in 1844 "conditions were far worse than in a northern industrial parish, that population density was 8.6 people to a (small) house, and that there were 1,400 houses in an area less than  square"; and in 1861 John Hollingshead, of The Morning Post, in his Ragged London noted that the Nichol had grown even more squalid in the last 20 years as old houses decayed and traditional trades became masks for thieves and prostitutes. The Builder in 1863, noted the numbers inhabiting unfit cellars, the lack of sanitation and that running water was only available for 10–12 minutes each day.

Demand for change

The clearance of the slum houses of the Old Nichol Street rookery was the result of an energetic campaign by the local incumbent, Reverend Osborne Jay of Holy Trinity, who arrived in the parish in December 1886. Charles Booth had already noted the extreme poverty in the area in his study of London poverty. Nearly 6,000 individuals were crammed into the packed streets. The death rate was twice that of the rest of Bethnal Green, and four times that of London. One child in four died before his or her first birthday.

Redevelopment had been resisted by members of the Bethnal Green vestry, who owned much of the rookery, and were responsible for electing members of the Metropolitan Board of Works. The powers the vestries and board were limited to the Torrens Act and the Artisans' and Labourers' Dwellings Improvement Act 1875 (Cross Act) which the Bethnal Green vestry refused to use.

Jay persuaded Arthur Morrison to visit the area, and the result was the influential A Child of the Jago, a barely fictionalised account of the life of a child in the slum, re-christened by Morrison as The Jago: "What was too vile for Kate Street, Seven Dials, and Ratcliffe Highway in its worst day, what was too useless, incapable and corrupt — all that teemed on the Old Jago". Demolition actually began before the publication of the book.

The London County Council was created by the Local Government (England and Wales) Act 1888, some 53 years after other major cities had been municipalised. It took responsibility for the housing of the working classes from the Metropolitan Board of Works. In the first election, the progressives obtained a large majority. The Housing Committee secured from Parliament the Housing of the Working Classes Act 1890, which gave it powers to implement the Torrens and Cross acts, and gave legal basis for it to manage housing estates. LCC chose Boundary Street as their flagship scheme. Initially they attempted to get the private sector involved but failed. In 1893, on the back of the 1892 Blackwall Tunnel Act they gained permission from the Home Secretary, to rebuild a small section of the scheme. The principle had been established.

The Boundary Street Scheme 

What became known as the Bethnal Green Improvement Scheme displaced 5,719 people and demolished 730 houses. Originally it was planned as a series of rectangular plots, but in 1893 a radial plan that would house a greater number of people was approved.

Owen Fleming designed the Boundary Street scheme. Old Nichol Street was also widened and extended to Mount Street, then renamed Swanfield Street. He designed . wide tree lined streets to radiate from an ornamental space called Arnold Circus. The LCC architects designed 21 and Rowland Plumbe two of 23 blocks containing between 10 and 85 tenements each. A total of 1,069 tenements, mostly two or three-roomed, were planned to accommodate 5,524 persons. The project was hailed as setting "new aesthetic standards for housing the working classes" and included a new laundry, 18 shops, and 77 workshops. Churches and schools were preserved. Building for the project began in 1893. The two schools, Rochelle School, which was largely built in 1879, and Virginia School, built in 1887, predated the estate.

The new flats replaced the existing slums with decent accommodation for the same number of people, but the occupiers changed. The original inhabitants were forced further to the East, creating new overcrowding and new slums in areas such as Dalston and Bethnal Green. No help was offered to those displaced to find new accommodation, and this added to the suffering and misery of many of the former residents of the slum. The new blocks had policies to enforce sobriety and the new tenants were clerks, policemen, cigarmakers and nurses.

Such was the success of the campaign, that the Prince of Wales officially opened the estate in early March 1900, saying Few indeed will forget this site who had read Mr Morrison's A Child of the Jago, and all of us are familiar with the labours of that most excellent philanthropist, Mr. Jay, in this neighbourhood.

The impresarios and brothers Lew Grade and Bernard Delfont (born Winogradsky) moved to the Boundary Estate in 1914, from nearby Brick Lane and attended Rochelle Street School. At that time, 90% of children attending the school spoke Yiddish.

Revival
Tower Hamlets Council has made proposals to transfer the estate to a housing association, and upgrade the accommodation. A full refurbishment of one of the blocks, Iffley House was carry out by Sprunt Architects to demonstrate how this might be achieved but the proposal was rejected by a ballot of tenants in November 2006.

The estate radiates from a centrepiece roundabout, Arnold Circus, formed around a garden with a bandstand. It is now being preserved by the Friends of Arnold Circus and has received grants for regeneration. Restoration work on the bandstand was completed in 2010.

Arnold Circus is also a mark point on several ley alignments including Alfred Watkins' "Strand Ley" and "The Coronation Line", which is curious as before 1893, there was no intersection or feature here.

One of the roads that link into the circus is the northern end of Club Row, a part of Brick Lane market, well known as an animal market until this activity was closed down in 1983.

Conservation area

The flats remain and are Grade II listed, together with the bandstand. In their day, they were revolutionary in their provision of facilities for residents. Today, despite the lack of some modern amenities they remain popular with tenants and there is an active community.

Listed gardens
Arnold Circus Gardens

Grade II listed buildings
Bandstand at Boundary Street Garden, Arnold Circus.
Iron Railings and Overthrows at Boundary Street Garden, Arnold Circus
4–5 Virginia Road
Marlow House, Arnold Circus: Built in 1899.
Marlow Workshops, Arnold Circus: Built in 1899.
Virginia Primary School, Arnold Circus: London School Board design of 1875 with later alterations. A classic three-decker designed by E.H.Robson.
Area railings at nos. 35 to 49, Arnold Circus
Chertsey House, Arnold Circus: Designed by Reginald Minton Taylor in 1895
Sunbury House, Swanfield Street: built 1894-6 by C. C. Winmill.
Sunbury Workshops, Swanfield Street: designed by C.C. Winmill 1894
Taplow House, Palissy Street: built 1894-6 by C. C. Winmill
Hurley House, Arnold Circus
Culham House, Rochelle Street: built 1894-6 by C. C. Winmill
Sonning House, Swanfield Street: built 1894-6 by C. C. Winmill.
Henley House, Swanfield Street: built 1894 by Roland Plumbe.
Walton House, Montclare Street.
Iron Railings between Henley House and Walton House, Old Nichol Street.
Cookham House, Montclare Street: this is an 1897 building by R. Minton Taylor, said to be built in a more mature style.
Porters’ House (former laundry), Montclare Street: this is the old laundry as the blocks lacked washing facilities, however no bath-house was provided. Built in 1894-6 by William Hynam.
Sandford House, Arnold Circus: designed by R Minton Taylor in 1895/1896.
Clifton House, Club Row
Molesey House, Camlet Street
Iffley House, Arnold Circus: Classically detailed and designed, 1896-8 by A. M. Phillips. The entrance is at the rear, leaving the facade free for a pair of broad windows to the ground floor in glazed brown brick.
Laleham House, Camlet Street
Hedsor House, Ligonier Street: one of four designs by C.C. Winmill 1898
Iron railings, Gate and Gate Piers between Laleham House and Hedsor House, Old Nichol Street
Benson House, Ligonier Street
Abingdon House, Boundary Street:Built 1896-8 by A. M. Phillips. It had a conical tower.
Wargrave House, Navarre Street:Built 1897 and designed by William Hynam
Shiplake House, Arnold Circus: Built in 1897
Walker House, 6–8 Boundary Street

Rochelle Primary School, Arnold Circus
Rochelle Primary School Infants, Club Row
Rochelle Primary School House, Arnold Circus
Iron Railings at Rochelle Primary School, Arnold Circus
Playground Wall at Rochelle Primary School

Streatley Buildings were demolished in 1971 These were the first dwellings on the Boundary Estate, on the east side. They were spartan larger flats erected 1893-4.

Rochelle School
The 1870 Elementary Education Act made it compulsory for all children between the ages of five and twelve to be given a basic education at public expense. This was to be provided by Board Schools- and school boards were set up across the country to build and run these schools. It was estimated that 100,000 places would be required in London which was a gross underestimation and 500,000 had been provided by 1900. The architect who oversaw this was E.R.Robson, a student of George Gilbert Scott.The two school houses on the Rochelle campus, juniors and infants, were early examples of Robson's work.

The Rochelle School is now a community arts facility.

Transport
The nearest London Overground station, Shoreditch High Street railway station, opened on 4 April 2010.

References

Further reading
Rosemary Taylor – Walks Through History – Exploring the East End (Breedon Books, 2001)

External links

Art Community housed in 1896 Rochelle School, built to serve the children of the Boundary Estate
Boundary Estate 1 – A Brief History – Boundary Estate Community Launderette
Friends of Arnold Circus community website

Grade II listed buildings in the London Borough of Tower Hamlets
Housing estates in the London Borough of Tower Hamlets
Geography of the London Borough of Tower Hamlets
Tourist attractions in the London Borough of Tower Hamlets
Shoreditch
Tourist attractions in London